This is a list of finalists for the 2013 Archibald Prize for portraiture. As the images are copyrighted, an external link to an image has been listed where available (listed is Artist – Title). 

Abdul Abdullah – The man (Portrait of Anthony Mundine) (Image)
Giles Alexander – Simulations (Portrait of Lily Serna) (Image)
Del Kathryn Barton – hugo (Portrait of Hugo Weaving) (Winner of the 2013 Archibald Prize) (Image)
Jason Benjamin – Fight Club (Portrait of McLean Edwards) (Image)
Natasha Bieniek – Application (Self-portrait) (Image)
Mitch Cairns – Self-portrait (Image)
Marcus Callum – Portrait of the artist as a young man (Portrait of his son Sebastian) (Image)
Julia Ciccarone – Portrait of Nicholas Jones (Image)
 Peter Daverington – The patriot: self-portrait with Albino Joey (Image)
Julie Dowling – Wilfred Hicks (Image)
McLean Edwards – Glenn Barkley, curator (Image)
John Emmerig – Gageler (Image)
Vincent Fantauzzo – Love face (Portrait of Asher Keddie) (Winner of the 2013 People's Choice Award) (Image)
Prudence Flint – Ukulele (Portrait of Athena Bellas) (Image)
Warwick Gilbert – Don Walker (Image)
Mertim Gokalp – Derwish: a portrait of Bille Brown (Image)
David Griggs – TV Moore (Image)
Sarah Hendy – Jasper Knight (Image)
Paul Jackson – Jo (Portrait of Joanna Braithwaite) (Image)
Alan Jones – Corro (Portrait of Pat Corrigan) (Image)
Jasper Knight – Adam Cullen: the light is a drip on a dark hood (Image)
Michael Lindeman – Dear Trustees (self-portrait)  (Image)
Fiona Lowry – Shaun Gladwell (Image)
 Mathew Lynn – Tara Moss (Winner of the 2013 Packing Room Prize) (Image)
Amanda Marburg – Ken Done (Image)
Abbey McCulloch – Naomi Watts (Image)
Alexander McKenzie – Toni Collette (Image)
Joshua McPherson – Portrait of Ella (Ella Nicol) (Image)
Guy Morgan – Guy Morgan with Peter Pan after retinal detachment (Image)
Carlo Pagoda – Habit de jardinier (Portrait of Pietro Pagoda) (Image)
James Powditch – Ben Quilty, where is my mind? (after the Pixies) (Image)
Sally Ryan –  Dr Catherine Hamlin AC (MBBS, FRCS, FRANZCOG, FRCOG) (Image)
 Wendy Sharpe – Anything goes (Venus vamp – burlesque star) (Image)
 Imants Tillers – The emergency of being (Self-portrait) (Image)
 Michael Vale – Warren Ellis (Image)
Xu Wang – Self-portrait (interviewing Maoist victims) (Image)
Heidi Yardley – Self-portrait: harlequin (Image)
Joshua Yeldham – Self-portrait: Morning Bay (Image)
Michael Zavros – Bad dad (Self-portrait) (Image)

See also 
Previous year: List of Archibald Prize 2012 finalists
Next year: List of Archibald Prize 2014 finalists
List of Archibald Prize winners

External links
Archibald Prize 2013 finalists official website

2013
Archibald
Archibald Prize 2013
Archibald Prize 2013
Arch
Archibald